Gentleman Junkie and Other Stories of the Hung-Up Generation is an early collection of short stories by Harlan Ellison, originally published in paperback in 1961. Most of the stories were written while Ellison was a draftee in the United States army between 1957 and 1959.  These were sold to Rogue Magazine, a pulp fiction magazine of the era.  Other stories in the collection had appeared previously in publications ranging from Alfred Hitchcock's Mystery Magazine to a Chicago weekly newspaper.

Gentleman Junkie... is different from many of Ellison's subsequent short story collections in that none of the stories are in the speculative fiction genre.  The stories provide social commentary on racial discrimination, bigotry, and other forms of injustice prevalent in United States during the 1950s.  In particular, 'Daniel White for the Greater Good' and 'The Night of Delicate Terrors' depict the plight of African Americans prior to the Civil Rights Act of 1964.  Other stories also deal with oppression and injustice.  'Free With This Box' is based on an occurrence in Ellison's childhood and describes abuse of power by police.

Dorothy Parker famously gave it a good review, saying Ellison was "a good, honest, clean writer, putting down what he has seen and known, and no sensationalism about it."  Ellison has since stated that the positive review from such a prominent literary figure changed his life and gave him a sense of validation as an author.

Contents
Foreword (by Frank M. Robinson)
Introduction: The Children of Nights (1961 edition)
New Introduction: The Children of Nights (1975 edition)
Final Shtick
Gentleman Junkie
May We Also Speak? Four Statements from the Hung-Up Generation:
Now You're on the Box!
The Rocks of Gogroth
Payment Returned, Unopened
The Truith
Daniel White for the Greater Good
Lady Bug, Lady Bug
Free With This Box!
There's One on Every Campus
At the Mountains of Blindness
This is Jackie Spinning
No Game for Children
The Late, Great Arnie Draper
High Dice
Enter the Fanatic, Stage Center
Someone is Hungrier
Memory of a Muted Trumpe
The Time of the Eye (1961 edition)
Turnpike (1975 edition)
Sally in Our Alley
The Silence of Infidelity
Have Coolth
RFD #2 (with H. Slesar)
No Fourth Commandment
The Night of Delicate Terrors

External Reviews
http://www.islets.net/collections/gentleman.html

Short story collections by Harlan Ellison
1961 short story collections